Ian Scott (9 January 1915 – 15 May 1980) was a British cyclist. He won a silver medal in the team road race at the 1948 Summer Olympics in London, together with Bob Maitland, Gordon Thomas and Ernie Clements. He placed 16th in the individual road race.

References

External links
 

1915 births
1980 deaths
British male cyclists
Cyclists at the 1948 Summer Olympics
Olympic cyclists of Great Britain
Olympic silver medallists for Great Britain
Olympic medalists in cycling
Place of birth missing
Medalists at the 1948 Summer Olympics